Puygaillard-de-Lomagne is a commune in the Tarn-et-Garonne department in the Occitanie region in southern France.

See also
Communes of the Tarn-et-Garonne department

References

Communes of Tarn-et-Garonne